Mykyta Peterman (born 12 June 1999) is a Ukrainian professional footballer who plays as a midfielder for KF Laçi.

Career
Peterman is a product of Berdyansk and Azovstal Mariupol youth sportive school systems.

He made his début for FC Mariupol in the Ukrainian Premier League as a substituted player in the losing match against FC Shakhtar Donetsk on 26 May 2019.

On 4 April 2022, Peterman joined Zagłębie Sosnowiec in Poland on loan until the end of the season.

References

External links
 Statistics at UAF website (Ukr)
 

1999 births
Living people
People from Berdiansk
Ukrainian footballers
Ukrainian expatriate footballers
FC Mariupol players
FC Illichivets-2 Mariupol players
Zagłębie Sosnowiec players
KF Laçi players
Ukrainian Premier League players
Ukrainian Second League players
I liga players
Association football midfielders
Expatriate footballers in Poland
Ukrainian expatriate sportspeople in Poland
Expatriate footballers in Albania
Ukrainian expatriate sportspeople in Albania
Sportspeople from Zaporizhzhia Oblast